In mathematics, a fractal is a geometric shape containing detailed structure at arbitrarily small scales, usually having a fractal dimension strictly exceeding the topological dimension. Many fractals appear similar at various scales, as illustrated in successive magnifications of the Mandelbrot set. This exhibition of similar patterns at increasingly smaller scales is called self-similarity, also known as expanding symmetry or unfolding symmetry; if this replication is exactly the same at every scale, as in the Menger sponge, the shape is called affine self-similar.  Fractal geometry lies within the mathematical branch of measure theory.

One way that fractals are different from finite geometric figures is how they scale. Doubling the edge lengths of a filled polygon multiplies its area by four, which is two (the ratio of the new to the old side length) raised to the power of two (the conventional dimension of the filled polygon). Likewise, if the radius of a filled sphere is doubled, its volume scales by eight, which is two (the ratio of the new to the old radius) to the power of three (the conventional dimension of the filled sphere). However, if a fractal's one-dimensional lengths are all doubled, the spatial content of the fractal scales by a power that is not necessarily an integer and is in general greater than its conventional dimension. This power is called the fractal dimension of the geometric object, to distinguish it from the conventional dimension (which is formally called the topological dimension).

Analytically, many fractals are nowhere differentiable. An infinite fractal curve can be conceived of as winding through space differently from an ordinary line – although it is still topologically 1-dimensional, its fractal dimension indicates that it locally fills space more efficiently than an ordinary line.

Starting in the 17th century with notions of recursion, fractals have moved through increasingly rigorous mathematical treatment to the study of continuous but not differentiable functions in the 19th century by the seminal work of Bernard Bolzano, Bernhard Riemann, and Karl Weierstrass, and on to the coining of the word fractal in the 20th century with a subsequent burgeoning of interest in fractals and computer-based modelling in the 20th century.

There is some disagreement among mathematicians about how the concept of a fractal should be formally defined. Mandelbrot himself summarized it as "beautiful, damn hard, increasingly useful. That's fractals." More formally, in 1982 Mandelbrot defined fractal as follows: "A fractal is by definition a set for which the Hausdorff–Besicovitch dimension strictly exceeds the topological dimension." Later, seeing this as too restrictive, he simplified and expanded the definition to this: "A fractal is a rough or fragmented geometric shape that can be split into parts, each of which is (at least approximately) a reduced-size copy of the whole." Still later, Mandelbrot proposed "to use fractal without a pedantic definition, to use fractal dimension as a generic term applicable to all the variants".

The consensus among mathematicians is that theoretical fractals are infinitely self-similar iterated and detailed mathematical constructs, of which many examples have been formulated and studied. Fractals are not limited to geometric patterns, but can also describe processes in time. Fractal patterns with various degrees of self-similarity have been rendered or studied in visual, physical, and aural media and found in nature, technology, art, architecture and law. Fractals are of particular relevance in the field of chaos theory because they show up in the geometric depictions of most chaotic processes (typically either as attractors or as boundaries between basins of attraction).

Etymology

The term "fractal" was coined by the mathematician Benoît Mandelbrot in 1975. Mandelbrot based it on the Latin , meaning "broken" or "fractured", and used it to extend the concept of theoretical fractional dimensions to geometric patterns in nature.

Introduction 

The word "fractal" often has different connotations for the lay public as opposed to mathematicians, where the public is more likely to be familiar with fractal art than the mathematical concept. The mathematical concept is difficult to define formally, even for mathematicians, but key features can be understood with a little mathematical background.

The feature of "self-similarity", for instance, is easily understood by analogy to zooming in with a lens or other device that zooms in on digital images to uncover finer, previously invisible, new structure. If this is done on fractals, however, no new detail appears; nothing changes and the same pattern repeats over and over, or for some fractals, nearly the same pattern reappears over and over. Self-similarity itself is not necessarily counter-intuitive (e.g., people have pondered self-similarity informally such as in the infinite regress in parallel mirrors or the homunculus, the little man inside the head of the little man inside the head ...). The difference for fractals is that the pattern reproduced must be detailed.

This idea of being detailed relates to another feature that can be understood without much mathematical background: Having a fractal dimension greater than its topological dimension, for instance, refers to how a fractal scales compared to how geometric shapes are usually perceived. A straight line, for instance, is conventionally understood to be one-dimensional; if such a figure is rep-tiled into pieces each 1/3 the length of the original, then there are always three equal pieces. A solid square is understood to be two-dimensional; if such a figure is rep-tiled into pieces each scaled down by a factor of 1/3 in both dimensions, there are a total of 32 = 9 pieces.

We see that for ordinary self-similar objects, being n-dimensional means that when it is rep-tiled into pieces each scaled down by a scale-factor of 1/r, there are a total of rn pieces. Now, consider the Koch curve. It can be rep-tiled into four sub-copies, each scaled down by a scale-factor of 1/3. So, strictly by analogy, we can consider the "dimension" of the Koch curve as being the unique real number D that satisfies 3D = 4. This number is called the fractal dimension of the Koch curve; it is not the conventionally perceived dimension of a curve. In general, a key property of fractals is that the fractal dimension differs from the conventionally understood dimension (formally called the topological dimension).

This also leads to understanding a third feature, that fractals as mathematical equations are "nowhere differentiable". In a concrete sense, this means fractals cannot be measured in traditional ways. To elaborate, in trying to find the length of a wavy non-fractal curve, one could find straight segments of some measuring tool small enough to lay end to end over the waves, where the pieces could get small enough to be considered to conform to the curve in the normal manner of measuring with a tape measure. But in measuring an infinitely "wiggly" fractal curve such as the Koch snowflake, one would never find a small enough straight segment to conform to the curve, because the jagged pattern would always re-appear, at arbitrarily small scales, essentially pulling a little more of the tape measure into the total length measured each time one attempted to fit it tighter and tighter to the curve. The result is that one must need infinite tape to perfectly cover the entire curve, i.e. the snowflake has an infinite perimeter.

History

The history of fractals traces a path from chiefly theoretical studies to modern applications in computer graphics, with several notable people contributing canonical fractal forms along the way. 
A common theme in traditional African architecture is the use of fractal scaling, whereby small parts of the structure tend to look similar to larger parts, such as a circular village made of circular houses.
According to Pickover, the mathematics behind fractals began to take shape in the 17th century when the mathematician and philosopher Gottfried Leibniz pondered recursive self-similarity (although he made the mistake of thinking that only the straight line was self-similar in this sense).

In his writings, Leibniz used the term "fractional exponents", but lamented that "Geometry" did not yet know of them. Indeed, according to various historical accounts, after that point few mathematicians tackled the issues and the work of those who did remained obscured largely because of resistance to such unfamiliar emerging concepts, which were sometimes referred to as mathematical "monsters". Thus, it was not until two centuries had passed that on July 18, 1872 Karl Weierstrass presented the first definition of a function with a graph that would today be considered a fractal, having the non-intuitive property of being everywhere continuous but nowhere differentiable at the Royal Prussian Academy of Sciences.

In addition, the quotient difference becomes arbitrarily large as the summation index increases. Not long after that, in 1883, Georg Cantor, who attended lectures by Weierstrass, published examples of subsets of the real line known as Cantor sets, which had unusual properties and are now recognized as fractals. Also in the last part of that century, Felix Klein and Henri Poincaré introduced a category of fractal that has come to be called "self-inverse" fractals.

One of the next milestones came in 1904, when Helge von Koch, extending ideas of Poincaré and dissatisfied with Weierstrass's abstract and analytic definition, gave a more geometric definition including hand-drawn images of a similar function, which is now called the Koch snowflake. Another milestone came a decade later in 1915, when Wacław Sierpiński constructed his famous triangle then, one year later, his carpet. By 1918, two French mathematicians, Pierre Fatou and Gaston Julia, though working independently, arrived essentially simultaneously at results describing what is now seen as fractal behaviour associated with mapping complex numbers and iterative functions and leading to further ideas about attractors and repellors (i.e., points that attract or repel other points), which have become very important in the study of fractals.

Very shortly after that work was submitted, by March 1918, Felix Hausdorff expanded the definition of "dimension", significantly for the evolution of the definition of fractals, to allow for sets to have non-integer dimensions. The idea of self-similar curves was taken further by Paul Lévy, who, in his 1938 paper Plane or Space Curves and Surfaces Consisting of Parts Similar to the Whole, described a new fractal curve, the Lévy C curve.

Different researchers have postulated that without the aid of modern computer graphics, early investigators were limited to what they could depict in manual drawings, so lacked the means to visualize the beauty and appreciate some of the implications of many of the patterns they had discovered (the Julia set, for instance, could only be visualized through a few iterations as very simple drawings). That changed, however, in the 1960s, when Benoit Mandelbrot started writing about self-similarity in papers such as How Long Is the Coast of Britain? Statistical Self-Similarity and Fractional Dimension, which built on earlier work by Lewis Fry Richardson.

In 1975 Mandelbrot solidified hundreds of years of thought and mathematical development in coining the word "fractal" and illustrated his mathematical definition with striking computer-constructed visualizations. These images, such as of his canonical Mandelbrot set, captured the popular imagination; many of them were based on recursion, leading to the popular meaning of the term "fractal".

In 1980, Loren Carpenter gave a presentation at the SIGGRAPH where he introduced his software for generating and rendering fractally generated landscapes.

Definition and characteristics 
One often cited description that Mandelbrot published to describe geometric fractals is "a rough or fragmented geometric shape that can be split into parts, each of which is (at least approximately) a reduced-size copy of the whole"; this is generally helpful but limited. Authors disagree on the exact definition of fractal, but most usually elaborate on the basic ideas of self-similarity and the unusual relationship fractals have with the space they are embedded in.

One point agreed on is that fractal patterns are characterized by fractal dimensions, but whereas these numbers quantify complexity (i.e., changing detail with changing scale), they neither uniquely describe nor specify details of how to construct particular fractal patterns. In 1975 when Mandelbrot coined the word "fractal", he did so to denote an object whose Hausdorff–Besicovitch dimension is greater than its topological dimension. However, this requirement is not met by space-filling curves such as the Hilbert curve.

Because of the trouble involved in finding one definition for fractals, some argue that fractals should not be strictly defined at all. According to Falconer, fractals should be only generally characterized by a gestalt of the following features;

 Self-similarity, which may include:
 Exact self-similarity: identical at all scales, such as the Koch snowflake
 Quasi self-similarity: approximates the same pattern at different scales; may contain small copies of the entire fractal in distorted and degenerate forms; e.g., the Mandelbrot set's satellites are approximations of the entire set, but not exact copies.
 Statistical self-similarity: repeats a pattern stochastically so numerical or statistical measures are preserved across scales; e.g., randomly generated fractals like the well-known example of the coastline of Britain for which one would not expect to find a segment scaled and repeated as neatly as the repeated unit that defines fractals like the Koch snowflake.
 Qualitative self-similarity: as in a time series
 Multifractal scaling: characterized by more than one fractal dimension or scaling rule
 Fine or detailed structure at arbitrarily small scales. A consequence of this structure is fractals may have emergent properties (related to the next criterion in this list).
 Irregularity locally and globally that cannot easily be described in the language of traditional Euclidean geometry other than as the limit of a recursively defined sequence of stages. For images of fractal patterns, this has been expressed by phrases such as "smoothly piling up surfaces" and "swirls upon swirls";see Common techniques for generating fractals.

As a group, these criteria form guidelines for excluding certain cases, such as those that may be self-similar without having other typically fractal features. A straight line, for instance, is self-similar but not fractal because it lacks detail, and is easily described in Euclidean language without a need for recursion.

Common techniques for generating fractals 

Images of fractals can be created by fractal generating programs. Because of the butterfly effect, a small change in a single variable can have an unpredictable outcome.

 Iterated function systems (IFS) – use fixed geometric replacement rules; may be stochastic or deterministic; e.g., Koch snowflake, Cantor set, Haferman carpet, Sierpinski carpet, Sierpinski gasket, Peano curve, Harter-Heighway dragon curve, T-square, Menger sponge
 Strange attractors – use iterations of a map or solutions of a system of initial-value differential or difference equations that exhibit chaos (e.g., see multifractal image, or the logistic map)
 L-systems – use string rewriting; may resemble branching patterns, such as in plants, biological cells (e.g., neurons and immune system cells), blood vessels, pulmonary structure, etc. or turtle graphics patterns such as space-filling curves and tilings
 Escape-time fractals – use a formula or recurrence relation at each point in a space (such as the complex plane); usually quasi-self-similar; also known as "orbit" fractals; e.g., the Mandelbrot set, Julia set, Burning Ship fractal, Nova fractal and Lyapunov fractal. The 2d vector fields that are generated by one or two iterations of escape-time formulae also give rise to a fractal form when points (or pixel data) are passed through this field repeatedly.
 Random fractals – use stochastic rules; e.g., Lévy flight, percolation clusters, self avoiding walks, fractal landscapes, trajectories of Brownian motion and the Brownian tree (i.e., dendritic fractals generated by modeling diffusion-limited aggregation or reaction-limited aggregation clusters).

Finite subdivision rules – use a recursive topological algorithm for refining tilings and they are similar to the process of cell division. The iterative processes used in creating the Cantor set and the Sierpinski carpet are examples of finite subdivision rules, as is barycentric subdivision.

Applications

Simulated fractals 
Fractal patterns have been modeled extensively, albeit within a range of scales rather than infinitely, owing to the practical limits of physical time and space. Models may simulate theoretical fractals or natural phenomena with fractal features. The outputs of the modelling process may be highly artistic renderings, outputs for investigation, or benchmarks for fractal analysis. Some specific applications of fractals to technology are listed elsewhere. Images and other outputs of modelling are normally referred to as being "fractals" even if they do not have strictly fractal characteristics, such as when it is possible to zoom into a region of the fractal image that does not exhibit any fractal properties. Also, these may include calculation or display artifacts which are not characteristics of true fractals.

Modeled fractals may be sounds, digital images, electrochemical patterns, circadian rhythms, etc.
Fractal patterns have been reconstructed in physical 3-dimensional space and virtually, often called "in silico" modeling. Models of fractals are generally created using fractal-generating software that implements techniques such as those outlined above. As one illustration, trees, ferns, cells of the nervous system, blood and lung vasculature, and other branching patterns in nature can be modeled on a computer by using recursive algorithms and L-systems techniques.

The recursive nature of some patterns is obvious in certain examples—a branch from a tree or a frond from a fern is a miniature replica of the whole: not identical, but similar in nature. Similarly, random fractals have been used to describe/create many highly irregular real-world objects. A limitation of modeling fractals is that resemblance of a fractal model to a natural phenomenon does not prove that the phenomenon being modeled is formed by a process similar to the modeling algorithms.

Natural phenomena with fractal features 

Approximate fractals found in nature display self-similarity over extended, but finite, scale ranges. The connection between fractals and leaves, for instance, is currently being used to determine how much carbon is contained in trees. Phenomena known to have fractal features include: 

 Actin cytoskeleton
 Algae
 Animal coloration patterns
 Blood vessels and pulmonary vessels
 Brownian motion (generated by a one-dimensional Wiener process).
 Clouds and rainfall areas 
 Coastlines
 Craters
 Crystals
 DNA
 Dust grains
 Earthquakes
 Fault lines
 Geometrical optics
 Heart rates
 Heart sounds
Lake shorelines and areas 
 Lightning bolts
 Mountain goat horns
 Polymers
 Percolation
 Mountain ranges
 Ocean waves
 Pineapple
 Proteins
 Psychedelic Experience
Purkinje cells
 Rings of Saturn
 River networks
 Romanesco broccoli
 Snowflakes
 Soil pores
Surfaces in turbulent flows
 Trees

Fractals in cell biology
Fractals often appear in the realm of living organisms where they arise through branching processes and other complex pattern formation. Ian Wong and co-workers have shown that migrating cells can form fractals by clustering and branching. Nerve cells function through processes at the cell surface, with phenomena that are enhanced by largely increasing the surface to volume ratio. As a consequence nerve cells often are found to form into fractal patterns. These processes are crucial in cell physiology and different pathologies.

Multiple subcellular structures also are found to assemble into fractals. Diego Krapf has shown that through branching processes the actin filaments in human cells assemble into fractal patterns. Similarly Matthias Weiss showed that the endoplasmic reticulum displays fractal features. The current understanding is that fractals are ubiquitous in cell biology, from proteins, to organelles, to whole cells.

In creative works

Since 1999 numerous scientific groups have performed fractal analysis on over 50 paintings created by Jackson Pollock by pouring paint directly onto horizontal canvasses.

Recently, fractal analysis has been used to achieve a 93% success rate in distinguishing real from imitation Pollocks. Cognitive neuroscientists have shown that Pollock's fractals induce the same stress-reduction in observers as computer-generated fractals and Nature's fractals.

Decalcomania, a technique used by artists such as Max Ernst, can produce fractal-like patterns. It involves pressing paint between two surfaces and pulling them apart.

Cyberneticist Ron Eglash has suggested that fractal geometry and mathematics are prevalent in African art, games, divination, trade, and architecture. Circular houses appear in circles of circles, rectangular houses in rectangles of rectangles, and so on. Such scaling patterns can also be found in African textiles, sculpture, and even cornrow hairstyles. Hokky Situngkir also suggested the similar properties in Indonesian traditional art, batik, and ornaments found in traditional houses.

Ethnomathematician Ron Eglash has discussed the planned layout of Benin city using fractals as the basis, not only in the city itself and the villages but even in the rooms of houses. He commented that "When Europeans first came to Africa, they considered the architecture very disorganised and thus primitive. It never occurred to them that the Africans might have been using a form of mathematics that they hadn’t even discovered yet."

In a 1996 interview with Michael Silverblatt, David Foster Wallace admitted that the structure of the first draft of Infinite Jest he gave to his editor Michael Pietsch was inspired by fractals, specifically the Sierpinski triangle (a.k.a. Sierpinski gasket), but that the edited novel is "more like a lopsided Sierpinsky Gasket".

Some works by the Dutch artist M. C. Escher, such as Circle Limit III, contain shapes repeated to infinity that become smaller and smaller as they get near to the edges, in a pattern that would always look the same if zoomed in.

Physiological responses 

Humans appear to be especially well-adapted to processing fractal patterns with D values between 1.3 and 1.5. When humans view fractal patterns with D values between 1.3 and 1.5, this tends to reduce physiological stress.

Applications in technology

 Fractal antennas
Fractal transistor
 Fractal heat exchangers
 Digital imaging
 Architecture
 Urban growth
 Classification of histopathology slides
 Fractal landscape or Coastline complexity
 Detecting 'life as we don't know it' by fractal analysis
 Enzymes (Michaelis-Menten kinetics)
 Generation of new music
 Signal and image compression
 Creation of digital photographic enlargements
 Fractal in soil mechanics
 Computer and video game design
 Computer Graphics
 Organic environments
 Procedural generation
 Fractography and fracture mechanics
 Small angle scattering theory of fractally rough systems
 T-shirts and other fashion
 Generation of patterns for camouflage, such as MARPAT
 Digital sundial
 Technical analysis of price series
 Fractals in networks
 Medicine
 Neuroscience
 Diagnostic Imaging
 Pathology
 Geology
Geography
 Archaeology
 Soil mechanics
 Seismology
 Search and rescue
 Technical analysis
 Morton order space filling curves for GPU cache coherency in texture mapping, rasterisation and indexing of turbulence data.

See also

Banach fixed point theorem 
Bifurcation theory
Box counting
Cymatics
Determinism
Diamond-square algorithm
Droste effect
Feigenbaum function
Form constant
Fractal cosmology
Fractal derivative
Fractalgrid
Fractal string
Fracton
Graftal
Greeble
Infinite regress
Lacunarity
List of fractals by Hausdorff dimension 
Mandelbulb
Mandelbox
Macrocosm and microcosm
Matryoshka doll
Menger Sponge
Multifractal system
Newton fractal
Percolation
Power law
Publications in fractal geometry
Random walk
Self-reference
Self-similarity
Systems theory
Strange loop
Turbulence
Wiener process

Notes

References

Further reading
 Barnsley, Michael F.; and Rising, Hawley; Fractals Everywhere. Boston: Academic Press Professional, 1993. 
 Duarte, German A.; Fractal Narrative. About the Relationship Between Geometries and Technology and Its Impact on Narrative Spaces. Bielefeld: Transcript, 2014. 
 Falconer, Kenneth; Techniques in Fractal Geometry. John Wiley and Sons, 1997. 
 Jürgens, Hartmut; Peitgen, Heinz-Otto; and Saupe, Dietmar; Chaos and Fractals: New Frontiers of Science. New York: Springer-Verlag, 1992. 
Mandelbrot, Benoit B.; The Fractal Geometry of Nature. New York: W. H. Freeman and Co., 1982. 
 Peitgen, Heinz-Otto; and Saupe, Dietmar; eds.; The Science of Fractal Images. New York: Springer-Verlag, 1988. 
 Pickover, Clifford A.; ed.; Chaos and Fractals: A Computer Graphical Journey – A 10 Year Compilation of Advanced Research. Elsevier, 1998. 
 Jones, Jesse; Fractals for the Macintosh, Waite Group Press, Corte Madera, CA, 1993. .
 Lauwerier, Hans; Fractals: Endlessly Repeated Geometrical Figures, Translated by Sophia Gill-Hoffstadt, Princeton University Press, Princeton NJ, 1991. , cloth.  paperback. "This book has been written for a wide audience..." Includes sample BASIC programs in an appendix.
 
 Wahl, Bernt; Van Roy, Peter; Larsen, Michael; and Kampman, Eric; Exploring Fractals on the Macintosh, Addison Wesley, 1995. 
 Lesmoir-Gordon, Nigel; The Colours of Infinity: The Beauty, The Power and the Sense of Fractals. 2004.  (The book comes with a related DVD of the Arthur C. Clarke documentary introduction to the fractal concept and the Mandelbrot set.)
 Liu, Huajie; Fractal Art, Changsha: Hunan Science and Technology Press, 1997, .
 Gouyet, Jean-François; Physics and Fractal Structures (Foreword by B. Mandelbrot); Masson, 1996. , and New York: Springer-Verlag, 1996. . Out-of-print. Available in PDF version at.

External links

 
 Hunting the Hidden Dimension, PBS NOVA, first aired August 24, 2011
 Benoit Mandelbrot: Fractals and the Art of Roughness , TED, February 2010
 Technical Library on Fractals for controlling fluid
 Equations of self-similar fractal measure based on the fractional-order calculus（2007）

 
Mathematical structures
Topology
Computational fields of study